Long Black Train is the debut studio album from American country music artist Josh Turner, released on October 14, 2003. It peaked at No. 29 on the U.S. Billboard 200, and peaked at No. 4 on the Top Country Albums. Overall, the album produced three chart singles for Turner on the Hot Country Songs charts: "She'll Go on You" (No. 46), the title track (No. 13), and "What It Ain't" (No. 31).

Two of this album's tracks were previously recorded by other artists. "You Don't Mess Around with Jim" is a cover of a Jim Croce hit single from 1972, while "The Difference Between a Woman and a Man" was previously recorded by Doug Stone on his 1999 album Make Up in Love.

Track listing

†Omitted from 2004 reissue.

Chart performance
Long Black Train peaked at No. 29 on the U.S. Billboard 200, and peaked at No. 4 on the Top Country Albums. On January 7, 2004 it was certified Gold and on November 19, 2004 it was certified Platinum by the RIAA.

Charts

Weekly charts

Year-end charts

Certifications

Personnel

Musicians
 Lisa Cochran - backing vocals (8)
 Melodie Crittenden - backing vocals (8)
 Eric Darken - percussion (all tracks), vibraphone (2,4)
 Shannon Forrest - drums (all tracks)
 Paul Franklin - pedal steel guitar (4,9,10,11)
 Carl Gorodetzky - string conductor (4,7,8)
 Kevin "Swine" Grantt - bass guitar (2,3,4,5,6,7,9,11), upright bass (1,8,10)
 Aubrey Haynie - fiddle (all tracks), mandolin (2)
 Wes Hightower - backing vocals (except 3 and 8)
 Steve Hinson - dobro (8), pedal steel guitar (2,3,5,6,7)
 Mike Johnson - pedabro (1)
 Charlie McCoy - harmonica (5)
 Pat McLaughlin - acoustic guitar (5,6), backing vocals (10)
 Liana Manis - backing vocals (11)
 Brent Mason - electric guitar (3,5,10)
 Steve Nathan - piano (all tracks)
 Frank Rogers - electric guitar (2), baritone guitar solo (9)
 Brent Rowan - acoustic guitar (2), electric guitar (1,4,5,6,7,9,10,11), baritone guitar (2,8), six-string bass guitar (4)
 John Wesley Ryles - backing vocals (3)
 Bryan Sutton - acoustic guitar (1,4,5,7,8,9,10,11), banjo (1,3,6), gut string guitar (4), resonator guitar (10)
 Russell Terrell - backing vocals (except 6)
 Josh Turner - lead vocals (all tracks)
 Bergen White - string arrangements (4,7,8)
 Nashville String Machine - string orchestra (4,7,8)

Technical
 Craig Allen - art direction, design
 Grey Banner - digital editing
 Richard Barrow  - engineer
 C.A. Dreyer - production assistant
 Greg Droman - engineer, mixing
 Greg Fogie - assistant
 Katie Gillon - art direction
 Todd Gunnerson - assistant
 Adam Hatley - digital editing
 Carie Higdon - production assistant
 Jason Lehning - engineer, digital editing
 Frank Rogers - producer
 Dave Schrober - string engineer
 Ronnie Thomas - digital editing
 Trish Townsend  - stylist
 Mark Tucker - photography
 Josh Turner - photography
 Hank Williams - mastering
 "Loopy Dave" Willis - digital editing
 Brian David Willis  - engineer
 Mark Wright  - producer

References

2003 debut albums
MCA Records albums
Josh Turner albums
Albums produced by Frank Rogers (record producer)
Albums produced by Mark Wright (record producer)